Silver Raiders is a 1950 American Western film directed by Wallace Fox and written by Daniel B. Ullman. The film stars Whip Wilson, Andy Clyde, Leonard Penn, Virginia Herrick, Dennis Moore and Patricia Rios. The film was released on October 20, 1950, by Monogram Pictures.

Plot

Cast              
Whip Wilson as Larry Grant
Andy Clyde as J. Quincy Jones
Leonard Penn as Lance Corbin
Virginia Herrick as Patricia Jones
Dennis Moore as Greg Boland
Patricia Rios as Dolores Alvarez
Reed Howes as George Barnes
Riley Hill as Bill Harris 
Marshall Reed as Horn 
George DeNormand as Clark
Kermit Maynard as Hank Larkin

References

External links
 

1950 films
American Western (genre) films
1950 Western (genre) films
Monogram Pictures films
Films directed by Wallace Fox
American black-and-white films
1950s English-language films
1950s American films